Air Marshal Eduardo Gomes (20 September 1896 – 13 June 1981) was a Brazilian politician and military figure. He was born in Petrópolis, Rio de Janeiro State, Brazil.

Gomes joined the army when he started his course at the Military School of Realengo. He finished this course in 1918 and, in December of the same year, he was transferred to Curitiba. In 1921 he started his course at the Military Aviation School in Rio de Janeiro. In the same year, the presidential campaign divided the oligarchies. Some military officers planned a coup to stop the candidate of the party in power, Artur Bernardes, if he was elected. However, the imprisonment of ex-president Hermes da Fonseca and the closing of the Military Club precipitated the start a rebellion on July 5, 1922. The rebels gave up quickly and only 28 resisted inside the Fort Copacabana. Gomes proposed that the rebels leave the fortress and face the government troops. They left, armed, and the diehard rebel group is still known as the 18 of the Copacabana Fortress.

Gomes was arrested but in 1923 he left prison. At the end of 1924, Gomes tried to join another rebellion in the south of Brazil led by Luís Carlos Prestes.  He was arrested in Santa Catarina and transferred to Rio de Janeiro.  He was transferred from one prison to another, until he was sent to Trindade Island.

When Washington Luís became President of Brazil in 1926, all the prisoners from Trindade Island were released.  The next June, Gomes was nearly arrested again, but he escaped to Campos, in Rio de Janeiro. Two years later, he handed himself in to the authorities and was imprisoned for two years.

In 1930, Gomes was freed, and once again was involved in revolutionary activities—this time with the intent of preventing president-elect Júlio Prestes from taking office. With the victory of the rebels, the ouster of president Washington Luís, and his replacement by Getúlio Vargas, he remained in high military command and notably led the 1st Aviation Division against a communist uprising in 1935. However, he resigned his military command following the establishment of the Estado Novo and became an opponent of Vargas.

Gomes was in the group that created the Military Air Post (Correio Aéreo Militar, CAM) in 1931.  In December 1945 Gomes was the candidate of the anti-Vargas conservative UDN for President of Brazil, but he lost the election to Eurico Gaspar Dutra. In October 1950 he ran again and lost to Getúlio Vargas.

In 1954 he was the Minister of Aeronautics in the brief administration of João Café Filho that followed the suicide of President Vargas.  He was in favor of the military takeover in 1964 that overthrew João Goulart, a vice-president who had taken office in 1961 upon the resignation of Jânio Quadros. In February 1965, still as Minister of Aeronautics, Gomes signed a controversial decree that shut down Panair do Brasil, the country's flag carrier airline. He remained as Minister of Aeronautics until the end of the government of Humberto de Alencar Castelo Branco, when he left public life (1967). Eduardo Gomes died on June 13, 1981.

Eduardo Gomes International Airport, in Manaus, Amazonas, is named after him.

See also
Brigadier
Brigadeiro

External links

History of the Brazilian Air Force – Marechal-do-Ar Eduardo Gomes
Marechal Eduardo Gomes 

Marshals of Brazil
Brazilian Air Force personnel
Marshals of the air force
1896 births
1981 deaths
People from Petrópolis
National Democratic Union (Brazil) politicians
Brazilian escapees
Escapees from Brazilian detention
Candidates for President of Brazil
Government ministers of Brazil